The 2020–21 SD Ponferradina season was the club's 99th season in existence and the club's second consecutive season in the second division of Spanish football. In addition to the domestic league, Ponferradina participated in this season's edition of the Copa del Rey. The season covered the period from 21 July 2020 to 30 June 2021.

Players

First-team squad

Reserve team

Out on loan

Pre-season and friendlies

Competitions

Overview

Segunda División

League table

Results summary

Results by round

Matches
The league fixtures were announced on 31 August 2020.

Copa del Rey

Notes

References

External links

SD Ponferradina seasons
Ponferradina